In Greek mythology, Mygdon (Ancient Greek: Μύγδων) may refer to the following personages:

 Mygdon, son of Ares and muse Calliope, eponymous of Mygdones
 Mygdon of Bebryces, killed by Heracles, son of Poseidon.
 Mygdon of Phrygia, king who was an ally of King Priam of Troy.

See also
 Mygdonia (disambiguation)

Notes

References 

 Apollodorus, The Library with an English Translation by Sir James George Frazer, F.B.A., F.R.S. in 2 Volumes, Cambridge, MA, Harvard University Press; London, William Heinemann Ltd. 1921. ISBN 0-674-99135-4. Online version at the Perseus Digital Library. Greek text available from the same website.
 Homer, The Iliad with an English Translation by A.T. Murray, Ph.D. in two volumes. Cambridge, MA., Harvard University Press; London, William Heinemann, Ltd. 1924. . Online version at the Perseus Digital Library.
 Homer, Homeri Opera in five volumes. Oxford, Oxford University Press. 1920. . Greek text available at the Perseus Digital Library.

Characters in Greek mythology